B-cell CLL/lymphoma 6 member B protein is a protein that in humans is encoded by the BCL6B gene.

References

External links

Further reading